Ewyas was a possible early Welsh kingdom which may have been formed around the time of the Roman withdrawal from Britain in the 5th century.  The name was later used for a much smaller commote or administrative sub-division, which covered the area of the modern Vale of Ewyas (now within Monmouthshire, Wales) and a larger area to the east including the villages of Ewyas Harold and Ewyas Lacy (now within Herefordshire, England).

A legendary kingdom
Some researchers interpret the evidence of the medieval Llandaff charters to suggest that early Ewyas may have encompassed much of south-east Wales, including the later kingdoms of Gwent and Ergyng. However, these sources are open to several interpretations and this is not generally accepted by mainstream historians.  Geoffrey of Monmouth gives the legend of Octavius (Welsh: Eudaf), "earl of Ewyas and Ergyng", in his famous pseudo-history Historia Regum Britanniae, making him a descendant of Caratacus who had led the Silures in battle against the Romans. According to Geoffrey, he took up a supposed "British High Kingship" after defeating Trahern, the brother of King Coel Godhebog, in the late third or early fourth century. There is no historical evidence to corroborate this and Coel's reign in the Hen Ogledd is usually placed in the 5th century. In the Welsh versions of the Historia, such as Brut Dingestow, Octavius is called Eudaf; this is the same legendary figure that appears in Breuddwyd Macsen Wledig as father of Elen, wife of Macsen Wledig, and living near Segontium in north Wales.
 
An 8th-century charter relating to the church at Clodock includes an account of its origin at a time when Clydawg, "king in Ewyas" was murdered while on a hunting expedition, and an oratory was built to commemorate his martyrdom.

Cantref
Whatever the origins of Ewyas may be, north of the present site of Longtown, a religious centre dedicated to St Beuno was founded at Llanveynoe, where what is probably the oldest stone cross in the modern county of Herefordshire stands, from around 600 AD.  At around the same time, a religious centre may have been founded at Llanthony, on the site of the later Priory.  In the mid 10th century there were seven cantrefs in Glamorgan, including "Ystradyw and Ewyas".

Lordship
In about 1046 Osbern Pentecost, a Norman follower of Edward the Confessor, built a motte and bailey castle at Ewyas Harold, believed to be one of the first built in Britain. Following the Norman Conquest, Ewyas remained in Welsh hands briefly under Rhydderch ap Caradog, apparently a client ruler of Ewyas obeisant to William the Conqueror. It was then granted to the Norman retainer Walter de Lacy

By the time of the Domesday Book in 1086, Ewyas or Ewias was an autonomous area bounded by the Black Mountains in the west, Graig Syfyrddin in the south, the line of the Golden Valley in the east, and Yager Hill and Cefn Hill to the north, just below the village of Clifford Castle near Hay-on-Wye.   Domesday records that Alfred of Marlborough held the castle of Ewyas of the king; this was presumably the re-built Pentecost Castle. Land around Ewyas Harold Castle was held by Walter's son Roger de Lacy.

Ewyas became a Marcher lordship, largely independent of the English crown. Further motte and bailey castles were built at Walterstone, Llancillo, Rowlestone and Clodock, followed after 1216 by Longtown Castle, presiding over the newly founded borough of Longtown.  The line of de Lacys ended in 1241, when the Lordship of Ewyas Lacy was divided.

Into Herefordshire and Monmouthshire
In 1536 the administration of Wales was re-organised, and the border between Herefordshire and Wales took more or less its present form, with the county of Herefordshire assimilating the Welsh territory of Ewyas Lacy.  The Llanthony valley, or Vale of Ewyas, became part of the hundred of Abergavenny, within Monmouthshire.  In 1852 the Parishes of Clodock with Longtown, Michaelchurch Escley, Craswall, St Margarets, Ewyas Harold, Rowlestone, Llancillo, Walterstone, Dulas and Llanveynoe were transferred from the diocese of St David's to that of Hereford.  To the west of Hatterall Ridge, the other old parishes of Ewyas – Llanthony, Cwmyoy and Oldcastle - were transferred from St David's to the diocese of Llandaff.

References

Cantrefs
History of Monmouthshire
History of Herefordshire